Tredwell is an English surname. It was the 13,038th most common surname in the United Kingdom in 1998. Notable people with the name include

 James Tredwell (born 1982), English cricketer
 Roger Tredwell (1885–1961), American diplomat
 Thomas Tredwell (1743–1831), American lawyer and politician from New York
 Triduana (also known as Tredwell), Scottish saint associated with the blind

See also
 Treadwell (disambiguation), a variant spelling of the surname
 Merchant's House Museum, also known as the Seabury Tredwell House

Notes